Saint Martins Peak (384 m above sea level) is a hill located southeast of the center of Tarnów, Poland, partly inside the city's administrative boundaries. It forms the northern edge of the threshold of the Carpathian foothills.

References 

Hills of Poland